Parochromolopis parishi is a moth in the family Epermeniidae. It was described by Reinhard Gaedike in 1977. It is found in Peru.

References

Moths described in 1977
Epermeniidae
Moths of South America